Ray Jerome Baker (December 1, 1880 – October, 1972) was an American photographer, film maker and lecturer.  His photographs are among some of the earliest professional works in Humboldt County, California and later in Hawaii where his work focused on the people of that state.

Biography 
Baker was born near Rockford, Illinois in 1880. From 1898 until 1903 he lived in Saint Paul, Minnesota, where he studied at Mechanic Arts High School and took his first photographs before attending the University of Minnesota for one semester.  In 1903, he moved to Portland, Oregon and shortly thereafter, in 1904, to Eureka, California.  On his arrival in Eureka, his studio was in a tent until moving into a building at 5th and F Streets where he ran a commercial photography studio and became a lifelong friend of the writer Jack London.  Baker regularly toured southern Humboldt County on a motorcycle in the early 20th century.

He met Edith Frost, a local school teacher, at a Socialist meeting in Eureka in 1906; they married shortly thereafter. 
Edith Frost Baker's family had holdings around Briceland and Miranda in southern Humboldt; the Bakers would visit them for the rest of their lives.   Baker's photos of southern Humboldt are some of the few images of the early 20th century.

During his years living in Humboldt County, Baker built "the Log House" on property that belonged to his mother-in-law who willed it to Baker's only son, Earl Frost Baker.   By 1908 he moved his photography business to a new studio at 825 E Street in Eureka and he took his family to Hawaii for the first time.

In August, after his return to Eureka, the Eureka Herald mentioned his name several times in connection with a charge of "taking obscene photographs"; he posted $100 bail and ended up paying a $50 fine.   In 1910 Baker moved to Honolulu with his wife and son. His studio and darkroom was located at 911 Kalakaua Avenue from 1915 until he retired in 1960.

Baker remained active as a photographer and travel lecturer until 1959. He produced thousands of photographic images as black-and-white prints, postcards and books, and as glass plates. When lecturing,  Baker used hand-painted lantern slides to dramatize his presentations; he made larger hand-colored glass plates backlit with daylight when exhibited. The glass plate lantern slides and many of the photographs taken by Baker were hand-colored by his wife Edith.

Baker traveled to New Zealand and to the U.S. mainland where he visited Mark Twain and Thomas Edison. Otherwise, he spent his time photographing the land, people and plants of Hawaii. He did commercial work for cane and pineapple plantations, and provided tourists arriving on ocean liners with mementos, mostly photographic postcards and bound books of photographs. His photographs appeared in mainstream media, including The National Geographic Magazine, Baker wrote a memoir in 1964, titled Odyssey of a Cameraman.

His studies of the Pacific people of Hawaii are an ethnographic and environmental resource. His Racial Patterns in Hawaii and his Familiar Hawaiian Plants, document a changing environment.

Ray Jerome Baker died in Honolulu on Friday, October 27, 1972, a funeral was held over his ashes.

Collections and archives 
Bishop Museum, Honolulu. A large collection of original prints, negatives, glass plate lantern slides, and ephemera.
Kaua'i Historical Society. A small photo album containing 187 original photographs taken by well-known Hawaii photographer, Ray Jerome Baker. Baker gave the album the title, "Kauai Over the Years - Scenes Mostly Old, Some New." The black and white images were taken by Baker on visits to Kauai between 1908 and 1961.
Swanlund-Baker Photograph Collection, Humboldt State University Library.  Large collection of correspondence and photographs from Baker's time in Northern California.

Selected works

Studio publications 
1912 - 1935 Alohaland 5″×7″
1912 - 1935 Hawaii 5″×7″
1912 - 1935 Hawaii-Nei 5″×7″
1914 Hawaiian Types printed booklet
1914 Palms and other Flora of the Hawaiian Islands printed booklet
1914 Hawaiian Island Views printed booklet
1914 Homes, Historical Buildings and Places of Interest in the Hawaiian Islands printed booklet
1936 The Romance of Raw Sugar
1938 Familiar Hawaiian Plants
1938 Camera Studies in Portraiture
1938 Hawaii the Isle of a Thousand Wonders
1938 Alohaland 11″×4″
1939 Hawaiian Yesterdays
1941 Hawaii Then and Now
1943 Scenic Hawaii
1945 Men of our Armed Forces
1945 Art Forms in Plant Structures
1964 Odyssey of a Cameraman, a memoir

References

External links 

 Photo collection at the Bishop Museum which includes a substantial amount of material from Ray Jerome Baker

Further reading 
Abramson, Joan. Photographers of Old Hawaii. Honolulu: Island Heritage Limited, 1981.
Baker, Ray Jerome. Unpublished diaries. Bishop Museum Archives. R.J. Baker Collection. Group 16.

1880 births
1972 deaths
Photographers from California
Photographers from Hawaii